Giant Bear (Nanurluk) is a 2019 Canadian animated short film, directed by Neil Christopher and Daniel Gies. The film depicts an Inuk hunter confronting a polar bear.

Although made by non-Inuit filmmakers, the film was carefully reviewed by a committee of Inuit historians and cultural figures to ensure that it depicted the story accurately and respectfully. The film was created with a mixture of traditional two-dimensional and three-dimensional animation techniques with real-time rendering technology.

A teaser preview of the film premiered at the Annecy International Animated Film Festival in 2018, before the completed film premiered in early 2019.

The film won the Canadian Screen Award for Best Animated Short at the 8th Canadian Screen Awards in 2020. It was subsequently selected for the 2020 edition of CBC Television's annual Short Film Face-Off competition.

References

External links
 

2019 films
2010s animated short films
Films about Inuit in Canada
Canadian animated short films
Best Animated Short Film Genie and Canadian Screen Award winners
2010s Canadian films